Idu, also Idum, (modern Satu Qala in the Sulaymaniyah Province of Iraqi Kurdistan) on the Lower Zab was an iron-age town.

History
The site was occupied in the Middle Assyrian period, based on an inscribed brick, an excavated palace, and a cylinder seal. Idu was part of the Neo-Assyrian Empire in its early days. It later gained independence and survived until the Parthian period.

Archaeology
Excavations were conducted in 2010 and 2011 involving researchers Diederik Meijer and Wilfred van Soldt from Leiden University, Leipzig University and Salahaddin University. Finds included 52 inscribed bricks dated 1050–850 BC. Further work awaits agreement with the locals of town of Satu Qala, which Idu sits beneath.

See also
Cities of the ancient Near East

References

External links
Illuminating a Dark Age: New Work at Satu Qala, Iraq - Expedition Magazine 
Ancient Kingdom Discovered Beneath Mound in Iraq  Live Science 2013
2010 Pilot excavation in Iraqi Kurdistan - Leiden Leipzig University - Shelby White and Leon Levy Program
Archaeological Excavations at Satu Qala, the Ancient Idu, Fieldwork 2010-2013
5,000-year-old Iraqi city discovered under a 10 meter-deep mound - Archaeology World 2020

Idu
Ancient cities of the Middle East